Presidential elections were held in Chile in 1836. Carried out through a system of electors, they resulted in the re-election of incumbent president Joaquín Prieto.

Prieto faced little opposition in this election and was easily re-elected.

Results

References

Presidential elections in Chile
Chile
1836 in Chile
Election and referendum articles with incomplete results